David McKendree Key (January 27, 1824 – February 3, 1900) was a United States senator from Tennessee, United States Postmaster General and a United States district judge of the United States District Court for the Eastern District of Tennessee and the United States District Court for the Middle District of Tennessee.

Education and career

Born on January 27, 1824, near Greeneville, in Greene County, Tennessee, Key attended the common schools, then graduated from Hiwassee College in 1850 and read law the same year. He received an Artium Magister degree from East Tennessee University (now the University of Tennessee). He was admitted to the bar and entered private practice in Madisonville, Tennessee from 1850 to 1852. He continued private practice in Kingston, Tennessee from 1852 to 1853, and in Chattanooga, Tennessee from 1853 to 1861. He was a Presidential Elector on the Democratic ticket in 1856 and 1860. He served in the Confederate States Army from 1861 to 1865, during the American Civil War and was promoted to lieutenant colonel of the Forty-third Tennessee Infantry. He resumed private practice in Chattanooga from 1865 to 1880. He was a member of the Tennessee constitutional convention in 1870. He was Chancellor for the Tennessee Chancery Court for the Third Judicial District from 1870 to 1875. He was an unsuccessful Democratic candidate for election to the United States House of Representatives of the 43rd United States Congress.

Congressional service

Key was appointed as a Democrat to the United States Senate to fill the vacancy caused by the death of former President of the United States and United States Senator Andrew Johnson and served from August 18, 1875, to January 19, 1877. He was an unsuccessful candidate for election to fill the vacancy in 1876.

Postmaster General

Key served as Postmaster General of the United States in the cabinet of President Rutherford B. Hayes from 1877 to 1880. The only Democrat in Hayes' cabinet, his appointment was in part due to the terms of the Compromise of 1877.

Federal judicial service

Key was nominated by President Rutherford B. Hayes on May 19, 1880, to a joint seat on the United States District Court for the Eastern District of Tennessee and the United States District Court for the Middle District of Tennessee vacated by Judge Connally Findlay Trigg. He was confirmed by the United States Senate on May 27, 1880, and received his commission the same day. His service terminated on January 21, 1895, due to his retirement.

Death

Key died on February 3, 1900, in Chattanooga. He was interred in Forest Hill Cemetery in Chattanooga.

See also

 List of United States political appointments across party lines
 David McK. Key

References

Sources
 
 
 Goodspeed Publishing, History of East Tennessee, Hamilton County. (1887)
 Dictionary of American Biography
 Abshire, David. The South Rejects a Prophet: The Life of David Key. New York: F.A. Praeger, 1967.
 Murrin, John M. Liberty, Equality, Power. Fourth Edition. Australia: Thomson Wadsworth, 2005.

1824 births
1900 deaths
Confederate States Army officers
United States Postmasters General
Judges of the United States District Court for the Eastern District of Tennessee
Judges of the United States District Court for the Middle District of Tennessee
People of Tennessee in the American Civil War
People from Greene County, Tennessee
Politicians from Chattanooga, Tennessee
United States federal judges appointed by Rutherford B. Hayes
19th-century American judges
Democratic Party United States senators from Tennessee
Tennessee Democrats
Hayes administration cabinet members
19th-century American politicians
United States federal judges admitted to the practice of law by reading law
People from Monroe County, Tennessee